Wallburg is German for hillfort, ringwork or fortified village and may refer to:

Places
 Wallburg, North Carolina
 Wallburg Realschule, a school in Eltmann, Germany
 , a village in the borough of Ettenheim, Germany

Castles and forts

Germany
 , in Lower Franconia, Germany
 , a ruined fort in Waldshut district, Baden-Württemberg, Germany
  near Meggen, Germany
 , North Rhine-Westphalia, Germany
 , Landkreis Breisgau-Hochschwarzwald, Baden-Württemberg, Germany
 , Bad Laasphe in Nordrhein-Westphalia, Germany
 , Alb-Donau-Kreis, Germany
 , Attendorn, Germany
 , Breisgau-Hochschwarzwald, Germany
 , Remscheid, Germany
 , Münster, Germany

Other places
 , Estonia
 Chrobry fortified village in Szprotawa Silesia, known in German as Wallburg Chrobry in Szprotawa

People
 Otto Wallburg (1889–1944), German actor

See also
 Burgwall (disambiguation)
 Wahlberg (disambiguation)
 Wahlsburg, municipality in Germany
 Walberg, a surname
 Walburg (disambiguation) 
 St. Walburg (disambiguation)
 Wallberg (disambiguation)
 Wallburger
 Wallenburg (disambiguation)